Pessograptis is a genus of moth in the family Gelechiidae.

Species
 Pessograptis cancellata Meyrick, 1914
 Pessograptis cyanactis Meyrick, 1930
 Pessograptis thalamias Meyrick, 1923

References

Chelariini